John Henry Michael "JT" Thompson (born June 15, 1959) is the inventor of the Lingo programming language  used in Adobe Director and a former Chief Scientist at Macromedia. He is a former professor in the Interactive Telecommunications Program (ITP) at the New York University Tisch School of the Arts and instructor at Drexel University. He is committed to teaching and motivating successive scions of tech developers. He is a graduate of MIT and the Art Student League of New York.

He spent part of his         childhood in Jamaica. His parents, in search of a better life for their children moved from the United Kingdom to New York. In 2012 he returned to his homeland Jamaica, to implement the Digital Jam 2.0 project. This included directing a course of mobile apps development workshops. According to him the vision for the project was to "export an innovative software development strategy to enable Jamaican youth to prosper in the global internet knowledge economy." He was honored for his innovations and commitment to coaching with the Silver Musgrave Medal for Science in 2012 by the Institute of Jamaica (IOJ).

Publications

References

External links
 

American inventors
Living people
1959 births